The Liga Elitelor is a system of youth football leagues that are managed, organised and controlled by the Romanian Football Federation. Introduced in 2015, it covers the under-17 and under-19 age groups.

Under-19 level

Champions

Under-17 level

Champions

References

External links
Liga Elitelor at frf.ro

Youth football leagues in Europe